Samuel Guarnaccia (October 1, 1908 – July 27, 2001) was the head football coach for the Middlebury College Panthers football team in 1942. He compiled a record of 0–8 and is the only Middlebury football coach to never win a single game.

Head coaching record

References

1908 births
2001 deaths
Middlebury Panthers football coaches